Martin T. Sherman is an American actor, director, writer and inventor.

Career
Sherman has starred in several films and television as well as providing voice acting for several video games, including Pac-Man in Pac-Man World 3, the first time the character ever had a voice actor in his games. From 2009 to 2015, Sherman voiced Thomas and Percy in the US version of the children's television series Thomas & Friends, as well as providing their voices for the Day out with Thomas dummy units (and the steam locomotive at the Strasburg railroad). He also voiced Diesel in the show's US dub from 2013 to 2015, taking over from former U.S. narrator Michael Brandon. After Sherman's departure from the series, Joseph May, Christopher Ragland, and Kerry Shale had taken over the roles of Thomas, Percy, and Diesel respectively, though Shale had already voiced the character in the U.K. dub.

In addition to his acting work, Sherman is also an inventor, specializing in ocean engineering.

Filmography

Film
Gangs of New York (2002) 
Hooligans (2005) – Mitch
The Tiger and the Snow (2005) – Soldato Americano
Ambition (2005)
Incubus (2006) – Orin Kiefer (voice) (uncredited)
Hero of the Rails (2009) – Thomas and Percy (US voice)
Leap Year (2010)
Misty Island Rescue (2010) – Thomas and Percy (US voice)
Captain America: The First Avenger (2011) – Brandt's Aide
Day of the Diesels (2011) – Thomas and Percy (US voice)
Blue Mountain Mystery (2012) – Thomas and Percy (US voice)
King of the Railway (2013) – Thomas, Percy and Diesel (US voice)
Tale of the Brave (2014) – Thomas and Percy (US voice)

Television
Orsum Island (2008) – Kodi (voice)
Thomas & Friends (2009–15) – Thomas, Percy and Diesel (US voice)
SkaterBots (2011-2016) – Rodney Hawkins (voice)
Doctor Who (2015) – Hell Bent - Man

Video games

Simon the Sorcerer II: The Lion, the Wizard and the Wardrobe (1995)
TimeSplitters: Future Perfect (2005)
Juiced (2005)
Sniper Elite (2005)
So Blonde (2008)
Deponia (2012)
The Crew (2014)
Jerry McPartlin: Rebel with a Cause (2015)
Randal's Monday (2015)
Homefront: The Revolution (2016)

Other work
Day Out with Thomas (2014–2015) - Thomas and Percy (voice, pre-record dialogue)

Production work

Miscelleaneous crew
Juiced (2005) – Writer
Crusty Demons (2006) – Voice Director
So Blonde (2008) – Director

References

External links

Living people
American male film actors
American male television actors
American male voice actors
American male video game actors
American voice directors
Video game directors
Video game producers
Video game writers
20th-century American male actors
21st-century American male actors
Year of birth missing (living people)